Caudellia nigrella is a species of snout moth in the genus Caudellia. It was described by George Duryea Hulst in 1890. It is found in California and Arizona.

References

Moths described in 1890
Phycitinae